Are You Ready for the Big Show? is the fourth album by American country music singer Radney Foster. It was released in 2001 for Dualtone Records. It is a live album, featuring re-recordings of Foster's past songs, including his first two singles, "Just Call Me Lonesome" and "Nobody Wins". Also included as a hidden track is "Texas in 1880", which Foster originally released in 1988 as one-half of Foster & Lloyd.

The version from this album, a duet with Pat Green, charted at number 54 on Hot Country Songs in 2001.

Critical reception
Giving it 4 out of 5 stars, Matt Reasor of Allmusic said that Foster "returns full circle to his neo-traditionalist roots". Jim Caliguri of The Austin Chronicle gave the album three stars, saying that it was "an accurate snapshot of another night of South Austin musical magic."

Track listing
All songs written by Radney Foster; co-writers in parentheses.
"Are You Ready for the Big Show?" — 0:15A
"Tonight" (Mac McAnally) — 4:14
"God Knows When" — 4:01
"Just Call Me Lonesome" (George Ducas) — 3:27
"Something Stupid" — 0:12A
"School of Hard Knocks" — 3:18
"Intro to Went for a Ride"  — 1:45A
"Went for a Ride" (Alice Randall) — 4:06
"I'm Used to It" — 4:13
"Folding Money" — 6:57
"Leaning on What Love Can Do" — 4:36
"How You Play the Hand" (Peter Smith) — 4:09
"Nobody Wins" (Foster, Kim Richey) — 4:19
"We Know Better" — 0:08A
"I'm In" (Georgia Middleman) — 5:56
"Texas in 1880" — 4:08B
duet with Pat Green
"Tonight (reprise)" (Foster, McAnally) — 4:06B

AInterstitial sketch.
BHidden track.

Personnel
Jeff Armstrong - Hammond organ, Wurlitzer
Ashley Arrison - backing vocals
Radney Foster - acoustic guitar, lead vocals, backing vocals
Pat Green - vocals on "Texas in 1880"
Byron House - upright bass
Mike McAdam - electric guitar, slide guitar
Charlie Miller - introduction
Chris Thile - mandolin
Matt Thompson - drums, trash cans, backing vocals

References

2001 live albums
Dualtone Records live albums
Radney Foster albums